Paley and Austin was the title of a practice of architects in Lancaster, Lancashire, England, in the 19th century.  The practice had been founded in 1836 by Edmund Sharpe.  The architects during the period covered by this list are E. G. Paley and Hubert Austin.  E. G. Paley had joined Edmund Sharpe in partnership in 1845.  This partnership continued until 1851, when Sharpe retired, and Paley ran the business as a single principal until he was joined by Hubert Austin in 1868.  The partnership of Paley and Austin continued until they were joined as a partner by Paley's son, Henry Paley, in 1886.

This list covers the ecclesiastical works executed by the practice during the partnership of E. G. Paley and Hubert Austin.  These works include new churches, restorations and alterations of older churches, additions to churches, and church fittings and furniture.  The practice designed over 40 new churches and restored or modified many more.  Because of the location of the practice, most of the ecclesiastical work was in the areas that are now Cumbria, Lancashire, and Greater Manchester, but examples can also be found in Cheshire, Merseyside, Yorkshire, Shropshire, Buckinghamshire, East Sussex, Kent, Wales, and Scotland.

Key

Works

Notes and references
Notes

Citations

Sources

Gothic Revival architecture
Paley and Austin